Chandrabati was a medieval Bengali poet, widely considered as the first known female poet of Bengali language. She is best known for her women-centered epic Ramayana.

Biography 
Chandravati was born to Dij-Banshidas Bhattacharya, in circa 1550 CE in the village of Patuyari, on the banks of the Fulesshori river in Kishoreganj which is currently located in Dhaka division of Bangladesh. Bansidas was a composer of Manasa's ballads known as Manasar Bhasaner Gan. According to Sambaru Chandra Mohanta, he was one of the composers of Manasamangal.

Chandravati was the first woman from the Indian subcontinent to compose the Ramayana in Bengali. She also composed Malua and doshsho kenaram. She narrated the Ramayana from Sita's point of view and criticized Rama.  Chandravati is a highly individual rendition as a tale told from a woman's point of view which, instead of celebrating masculine heroism, laments the suffering of women caught in the play of male ego. She however couldn't finish her work.

References 

1550s births
1600 deaths
Bengali female poets
People from Mymensingh District